Espen Nystuen (born 19 December 1981 in Kongsvinger) is a former Norwegian footballer.

Nystuen previously played for Kongsvinger. A part of the community since he was a child, he had never played for any other club until he was sold to Stabæk ahead of the 2006 season. He was sold from Stabæk to Sandefjord in March 2008, before signing for Lillestrøm as a free agent in March 2012. Before the season of 2013 he once again signed for Kongsvinger. This time with a divided role as the club`s CEO and a player.

Espen Nystuen is the son of former Kongsvinger player and coach Erik Nystuen. After the 2016 Nystuen decide to retire to focus on his job as a CEO.

Career statistics

References

1981 births
Living people
Sportspeople from Kongsvinger
Norwegian footballers
Kongsvinger IL Toppfotball players
Stabæk Fotball players
Sandefjord Fotball players
Lillestrøm SK players
Eliteserien players
Norwegian First Division players
Association football midfielders
Association football defenders
Norwegian football managers
Kongsvinger IL Toppfotball managers